The Funny Bone is a comedy club chain in the United States. The original Funny Bone Comedy Club opened in Pittsburgh, Pennsylvania by co-founders Mitch Kutash and Gerald Kubach in 1982. The Funny Bone has now expanded into markets nationwide including Albany, New York, Columbus, Ohio, Dayton, Ohio, Des Moines, Iowa, Manchester, Connecticut, Newport, Kentucky, Omaha, Nebraska, Syracuse, New York, Richmond, Virginia, Toledo, Ohio and Virginia Beach, Virginia.

Such personalities as D.L. Hughley, Drew Carey, Jerry Seinfeld, Chris Rock, Lewis Black, Ellen DeGeneres, Jeff Dunham, Pablo Francisco, Bobcat Goldthwait, Brett Butler, Marc Maron, and Bill Bellamy have all performed at the Funny Bone.

External links
 The Funny Bone

Comedy clubs in the United States